Art Monthly Australasia, also known as Art Monthly and formerly titled Art Monthly Australia, is an Australian visual arts magazine published since 1987.

Since 1992 the magazine has been published by non-profit publisher Art Monthly Australia Ltd under the auspices of the Australian National University's School of Art & Design in Canberra.

The full-time editors have included Peter Townsend, Peter Timms, Philippa Kelly, Deborah Clark, Maurice O’Riordan and  since 2014, Michael Fitzgerald.

Articles in the magazine contextualise and extend critical discourse about art of the Asia-Pacific region as well as in Australia.

References

External links

1987 establishments in Australia
Australian art
English-language magazines
Magazines established in 1987
Arts magazines published in Australia
Mass media in Canberra